The Scout and Guide movement in the Democratic Republic of the Congo is served by
 Guides de la République Démocratique du Congo, member of the World Association of Girl Guides and Girl Scouts
 Fédération des Scouts de la République démocratique du Congo, member of the World Organization of the Scout Movement

See also

 Scouting and Guiding in the Republic of the Congo